Juan Benavides Hermosilla (born June 25, 1975 in Madrid) is a former freestyle swimmer from Spain, who competed at two consecutive Summer Olympics for his native country, starting in 1996. There he finished in 30th and 33rd position in the 50m and 100m Freestyle.

References
 Spanish Olympic Committee

1975 births
Living people
Spanish male freestyle swimmers
Olympic swimmers of Spain
Swimmers at the 1996 Summer Olympics
Swimmers at the 2000 Summer Olympics
Swimmers from Madrid